Gurrampode is a village in the Nalgonda district of the Indian state of Telangana. It is located in Gurrampode mandal of Devarakonda division.

Geography
It has an average elevation of 209 metres (688 ft).

References

Villages in Nalgonda district
Mandal headquarters in Nalgonda district